Sayed Ali Asghar Kurdistani (‎; 1882–1936) was a Kurdish singer and musician. He is one of the first Kurdish singers that his voice was recorded. Most of the Kurds and Iranians, especially the Kurdish regions, know him with his unique voice as one of the unforgettable singers in the history of Kurdish and Persian music. The tone of his voice was so pleasant and attractive. People knew him because of his voice, the strength of his voice and the specific writings of his musical style. He was a real and unassuming person who sang for all those who liked his voice. One of the memorable works is Xamgin W Dl Pashewm. This song was recorded almost a hundred years ago.
He was living Kurdistan region in Iran, his remaining family known as Babashahabi, his eldest grand son was Seyyed Ibrahim Babashahabi in Sanandaj

Life
Sayed Ali-Asghar Kurdistani was born in a famous religious family in 1881 in Salavat-Abad (Selwat awa), a village belonging to Sanandaj (Sine). The father of Sayed Ali-Asghar, who was a famous religious man, brought him to the class of Sheikh Abd ol-Mo’men, so that he would be able to read and sing the Quran correctly. Kurdistani spent several years learning to sing Quran by Sheikh Abd ol-Mo’men and became an unprecedented Quran singer, so that his reputation reached over the borders resulting in his being invited to Egypt.Before the year 1905, he was married to Mahsharaf Khanum and the fruit of this marriage was three sons named Seyyed Abdulahed, Seyed Masih and Seyed Ali Ashraf and two daughters named Zahra and Sharaft.Kurdistani was a little bit over 40 years old, when he was invited by one of his admirers Mirza Ebrahim Khan, who requested him to come to Tehran. Mirza Ebrahim Khan brought him to a ceremony where one of the present singers was                  Qamar-ol-Moluk Vaziri, who was the most outstanding female singer of her time.

After Qamar finished her singing, Kurdistani were introduced by Mirza Ebrahim Khan to the attendees und was requested to sing. The accompanists put their instruments aside, as they didn’t know him. Kurdistani sang one note higher than the pitch of Qamar’s voice, much to the surprise (astonishment) of all the attendees, especially the present musicians, since so a pitch from a male singer seemed unimaginable. After the end of ceremony some of the attendees and present musicians insisted on Kurdistani staying in Tehran. Through the financial support of Mirza Ebrahim Khan،Kurdistani remained one month in Tehran and recorded nearly 30 songs on records with the Polyphon recording company. After that he returned to Sanandaj. It isn’t known who accompanied Sayid Ali Asghar Kurdistani on these records, but the style of Tar and Violin playing is very near to Morteza Khan’s and his brother Musa Khan’s style. The author believes that it is not possible to find a tar player who plays so similarly to Morteza Khan. These records were not protected carefully; therefore there are only 13 records which survived. Sayid Ali Asghar Kurdistani devised his own style of Kurdish music. Kurdistani has been dearly missed since his death in 1936 by all of his admirers and the world of Kurdish music.

Works
A few songs remained from Ali Asghar that have been recorded probably in Tehran or Sanandaj. These songs are either based on folklore Kurdish or classic Kurdish Iranian music. He used the poems of well-known Kurdish poets such as Tahir Bag and Wafayi. These few songs have been recreated and sung by many well-known Kurdish musicians including The Kamkars.

1882 births
1936 deaths
Kurdish male singers
Kurdish musicians
20th-century Iranian male singers